Gerald George Marshall (born 17 August 1955) was a Scottish footballer who played for Dumbarton and Clyde.

References

1955 births
Scottish footballers
Dumbarton F.C. players
Clyde F.C. players
Scottish Football League players
Living people
Association football forwards